Hexafluorobutadiene is an organofluorine compound with the formula (CF2=CF)2.  A colorless gas, it has attracted attention as an etchant in microelectronics.  It is the perfluoroanalogue of butadiene.

It can be prepared by coupling of C2 compounds such as from chlorotrifluoroethylene or bromotrifluoroethylene. Routes from C4 species have also been demonstrated.  For example, an early synthesis involved Zn-induced dechlorinaion of 1,2,3,4-tetrachloro-1,1,2,3,4,4-hexafluorobutane.

Hexafluorobutadiene dimerizes via a [2+2] process at 150 °C to give perfluorinated divinylcyclobutanes.

See also
 Hexafluoro-2-butyne, an isomer of C4F6
 Hexafluorocyclobutene, an isomer of C4F6
 Hexachlorobutadiene

References

Fluorocarbons
Monomers
Dienes